Speonectes tiomanensis is a species of stone loach that is endemic to Malaysia and only known from a cave on Tioman Island.  This fish reaches a length of  SL.  This species is the only known member of its genus, but it was formerly included in Sundoreonectes. It is the only cavefish known from Malaysia.

References

Nemacheilidae
Fish described in 1990
Monotypic fish genera
Endemic fauna of Malaysia
Freshwater fish of Malaysia
Cave fish
Taxonomy articles created by Polbot